Mary Margaret "Peggy" Cass (May 21, 1924 – March 8, 1999) was an American actress, comedian, game show panelist, and announcer.

She was nominated for an Academy Award for Best Supporting Actress and a Golden Globe Award for Best Supporting Actress – Motion Picture for her performance in the 1958 film Auntie Mame.

Early life
A native of Boston, Massachusetts, Cass attended Cambridge Latin School and became interested in acting as a member of the drama club. However, throughout her entire time at the school, she never had a speaking part in any of the club's productions. After graduating, she spent most of the 1940s in search of an acting career. She received acting training at HB Studio in New York City and eventually landed Jan Sterling's role in a traveling production of Born Yesterday.

Stage and film
Cass made her Broadway debut in 1949 with the play Touch and Go. Remembered today primarily as a regular panelist on the long-running To Tell the Truth, she played Agnes Gooch in Auntie Mame on Broadway and in the film version (1958), a role for which she won the Tony Award for Best Supporting Actress, and later received an Oscar nomination for Best Supporting Actress.

She was cast as "First Woman" in the nine-member ensemble for the 1960 Broadway revue A Thurber Carnival, adapted by James Thurber from his own works.  She played several characters throughout the performance including: the mother in "The Wolf at the Door", the narrator of "The Little Girl and the Wolf", a nameless American tourist (who insisted Macbeth was a murder mystery), Miss Alma Winege in "File and Forget" (who wanted to ship Mr. Thurber 36 copies of Grandma Was a Nudist which he did not order), Mrs. Preble in "Mr. Preble Gets Rid of His Wife", Lou in "Take Her Up Tenderly" (who was helping make old poetry more cheerful), and Walter Mitty's wife.

In 1961, she played Mitzi Stewart in the movie Gidget Goes Hawaiian. In 1964, she starred as First Lady Martha Dinwiddie Butterfield in the mock-biographical novel First Lady: My Thirty Days in the White House. The book, written by Auntie Mame author Patrick Dennis, included photographs by Cris Alexander of Cass, Dody Goodman, Kaye Ballard and others who portrayed the novel's characters.

In the late 1960s and early 1970s, she succeeded other actresses in Don't Drink the Water (as Marion Hollander) and in Neil Simon's Plaza Suite as well as played Mollie Malloy in two revival runs of The Front Page. She also appeared in the 1969 film comedy If It's Tuesday, This Must Be Belgium. In the 1980s, she returned to the stage in 42nd Street and in the 1985 run of The Octette Bridge Club.

Television and stage

According to Jack Paar, speaking in retrospect, he felt he may have ruined Cass's Oscar chances by lobbying too much for her on his enormously popular television series The Tonight Show. Cass filled in as announcer for Paar's late night talk show that aired in the 1970s on ABC.

In the 1961–1962 season, Cass and Jack Weston costarred in an ABC sitcom, The Hathaways, along with the Marquis Chimps, a showbiz troupe of chimpanzees that served as her "children" on the show. The Hathaways followed the new adventure series Straightaway on ABC, about two young men (John Ashley and Brian Kelly) involved in auto racing, but neither program could compete with CBS's Rawhide. In 1987, Cass was featured in the early Fox sitcom Women in Prison. Aside from sitcoms, she played the role of H. Sweeney on the NBC afternoon soap opera The Doctors from 1978 to 1979.

in addition to her work with Paar, Cass's notable television work included appearances on many game shows, mainly on shows based in New York City. She was a regular panelist on To Tell the Truth from 1960 through its 1990 revival, appearing in most episodes in the 1960s and 1970s. She was also a panelist on the pilot of the 1960s version of Match Game. On Truth and other series, she often displayed near-encyclopedic knowledge of various topics, and would occasionally question the logic of some of the "facts" presented on the program. Cass made several appearances on the $10,000 & $20,000 Pyramid hosted by Dick Clark from 1973 to 1980, as well as the nighttime version which was titled The $25,000 Pyramid (1974–1979), hosted by her friend Bill Cullen.  All three of these versions were taped in New York City.  She also appeared in the late 1970s on Shoot for the Stars hosted by Geoff Edwards, another game show that partnered contestants with celebrities, also filmed in New York City.

In 1983, she appeared in the New Amsterdam Theatre Company's concert staging of Kurt Weill and Ogden Nash's One Touch of Venus as Mrs. Kramer, with Susan Lucci as her daughter, as well as Lee Roy Reams, Ron Raines, and Paige O'Hara as the titular Venus. In the spring of 1991, she participated in a concert staging of Cole Porter's Fifty Million Frenchmen at New York City's French Institute/Alliance Francaise as Mrs. Gladys Carroll, singing Porter's "The Queen of Terre Haute".

Peggy Cass appeared on the first episode pilot of  Major Dad on September 17, 1989. She portrayed Esther Nettleton, a civilian secretary working on the Marine base for Maj. John "Mac" MacGillis.

Personal life and death
On March 8, 1999, Cass died of heart failure in New York City at the age of 74 at the Memorial Sloan-Kettering Cancer Center. She was survived by her second husband, Eugene Michael Feeney (1924–2013), a former Jesuit priest and educator. She had no children.

Filmography

Stage

Awards and nominations
Awards
1957 Tony Award, Best Featured Actress in a Play – Agnes Gooch in Auntie Mame
1957 Theatre World Award – Agnes Gooch in Auntie Mame

Nominations
1958 Academy Award for Best Supporting Actress – Agnes Gooch in Auntie Mame
1958 Golden Globe Award for Best Supporting Actress – Motion Picture – Agnes Gooch in Auntie Mame

References

External links 

 
 
 

1924 births
1999 deaths
American stage actresses
American television actresses
American television personalities
American women television personalities
Actresses from Boston
Tony Award winners
American women comedians
20th-century American actresses
20th-century American singers
Cambridge Rindge and Latin School alumni
20th-century American women singers
20th-century American comedians